Íñigo López may refer to:
the birth name of Ignatius of Loyola, founder of the Jesuits
Íñigo López, Lord of Biscay, the first known Lord of Biscay
Íñigo López de Mendoza, marqués de Santillan, Spanish poet
Íñigo López de Mendoza y Luna, 2nd Duke of the Infantado, Spanish nobleman
Íñigo López de Mendoza y Zúñiga, Spanish diplomat and ecclesiastic
Íñigo López de Mendoza, 4th Duke of the Infantado, Spanish nobleman
Íñigo López Montaña, Spanish footballer